El Beso may refer to:
 El Beso (sculpture), a sculpture in the Miraflores district of Lima, Peru
 El Beso (Mon Laferte song)
 El Beso (Pablo Alborán song)